George Dobson may refer to:

 George Dobson (rugby union) (1873–1917), Welsh rugby union forward
 George Dobson (rugby league), English rugby league footballer of the 1900s, 1910s and 1920s 
 George Dobson (footballer, born 1862) (1862–1941), English football player (Everton)
 George Dobson (footballer, born 1897) (1897–1950), English footballer (Barnsley, Norwich City and Rotherham County)
 George Dobson (footballer, born 1949) (1949–2007), English football player (Brentford)
 George Dobson (footballer, born 1997), English football player (Sunderland)
 George Edward Dobson (1848–1895), zoologist, photographer and army surgeon
 George L. Dobson (1851–1919), American politician
 George Dobson (surveyor) (1840–1866), New Zealand surveyor and engineer